Galanin receptor 2, (GAL2) is a G-protein coupled receptor encoded by the GALR2 gene.

Function 

Galanin is an important neuromodulator present in the brain, gastrointestinal system, and hypothalamopituitary axis. It is a 30-amino acid non-C-terminally amidated peptide that potently stimulates growth hormone secretion, inhibits cardiac vagal slowing of heart rate, abolishes sinus arrhythmia, and inhibits postprandial gastrointestinal motility. The actions of galanin are mediated through interaction with specific membrane receptors that are members of the 7-transmembrane family of G protein-coupled receptors. GALR2 interacts with the N-terminal residues of the galanin peptide. The primary signaling mechanism for GALR2 is through the phospholipase C/protein kinase C pathway (via Gq), in contrast to GALR1, which communicates its intracellular signal by inhibition of adenylyl cyclase through Gi. However, it has been demonstrated that GALR2 couples efficiently to both the Gq and Gi proteins to simultaneously activate 2 independent signal transduction pathways.

See also 
 Galanin receptor

References

Further reading

External links 
 

G protein-coupled receptors